Portage la Prairie was a federal electoral district in Manitoba, Canada, that was represented in the House of Commons of Canada from 1904 to 1949.

This riding was created in 1903 from parts of Macdonald  riding.

It was abolished in 1947 when it was redistributed into Norquay, Portage—Neepawa and Selkirk ridings.

Members of Parliament

This riding elected the following Members of Parliament:

John Crawford, Liberal (1904–1908)
Arthur Meighen, Conservative (1908–1921)
Harry Leader, Progressive (1921–1925)
Arthur Meighen, Conservative (1925–1926)
Ewan McPherson, Liberal (1926–1930)
William Herbert Burns, Conservative (1930–1935)
Harry Leader, Liberal (1935–1946)
Calvert Charlton Miller, Progressive Conservative (1946–1949)

Election results

By-election: On Mr. Meighen being appointed Solicitor General, 26 June 1913

By-election: On Mr. Leader's death, 9 May 1946

See also 

 List of Canadian federal electoral districts
 Past Canadian electoral districts

External links 

 Riding history for Portage la Prairie (1903–1947) from the Library of Parliament

Former federal electoral districts of Manitoba